Essie Jain is an English singer-songwriter born and raised in London, who is now based in Los Angeles.

Biography
Her first published work was a single track, "Why", on the album The Sound the Hare Heard, which contains a single track each from a large number of artists including Sufjan Stevens and Colin Meloy. This record was curated by Slim Moon and released by Kill Rock Stars.

In July 2006 she did a Take-Away Show video session shot by Vincent Moon. In this session, Jain played acoustic guitar and sang "Understand" and "Glory". Both songs would soon be released on her first full-length record.

Her first album, We Made This Ourselves, drew comparisons to the British folk singers Sandy Denny and Vashti Bunyan. This record was originally released in the United States on Ba Da Bing records and was later released in the rest of the world on The Leaf Label.

The New York Times wrote that "Ms. Jain builds stark miniatures out of a few light strums of guitar and her haunting alto. On her captivating new album, We Made This Ourselves, her voice is multitracked in precise harmonies that can be warm or ghostly."

Jain recorded a Daytrotter session that was released 7 April 2010.

In 2011, she started her own record label and released Until The Light Of Morning, an album of original lullabies for parent and child, written and recorded by Jain. As she says on her website: "This record is made for every parent and every baby (and anyone else) who needs to rest and head off into the land of sleep."

In 2013, Huffington Post announced the release of All Became Golden, her first audiovisual release, the result of a collaboration with filmmaker Natalie Johns and critically acclaimed composer/arranger Nico Muhly. Inspired by Frank Sinatra's recording process, a small audience was invited to witness these live orchestral recordings in the DiMenna Center for Classical Music in New York City, capturing a collaboration of Muhly and Jain, the recording process and Jain's deep connection to the music.

Jain has also practiced yoga, meditation and channeling for many years, and explored many different areas of the healing arts, which began to reveal itself as an influence on her work. In 2015 Jain released To Love, an album of modern chants and  movements. In 2016, she began writing and recording the Musical Meditation Series with her husband and longterm collaborator Patrick Glynn, which was inspired by the improvisations of their live performances. They recorded five songs; Harmony, Grace, Peace, Unity and Synergy.

In 2018, Jain released the album As I Return, which explored songs created for the expression of voice, and were designed to be used as companions to therapeutic healing practices.

In 2020, she began recording a series of singles. Three songs have been released so far, “Hold Us” “Vespers” and a children's lullaby “For Everyone”

Discography

Multiple artist albums 
The Sound the Hare Heard (Kill Rock Stars, 9 April 2006) (one song from Jain, titled "Why")

Albums 
We Made This Ourselves (US release Ba Da Bing, 13 February 2007)
We Made This Ourselves (worldwide release The Leaf Label, 31 March 2008)
Until The Light of Morning (worldwide release 2011)
All Became Golden (worldwide release 2013)
To Love (worldwide release 2015) 
Musical Meditation Series (worldwide release 2016)
As I Return (worldwide release 2018)

Singles 
Your Love (worldwide release 2015)
Hold Us (worldwide release 2020)
Vespers (worldwide release 2020)
For Everyone (worldwide release 2021)

References

Videos 
"Glory" taken from All Became Golden - Vimeo Staff Pick at 
"Your Love"

External links
Essie Jain Music website

English women singers
English songwriters
Living people
Musicians from London
Musicians from New York City
Year of birth missing (living people)